Richard L. Becker (November 3, 1905–February 18, 2004) was an American politician who served in the Kansas House of Representatives and Kansas State Senate.

Becker originally served in the Kansas House of Representatives from 1943 to 1949. On November 7, 1950, he was appointed to the state senate seat left vacant by the resignation of Clarence Oakes. Becker was re-elected in his own right in 1952 and served for one term before being succeeded by Walter Lewis McVey Jr.

References

1905 births
2004 deaths
Republican Party Kansas state senators
Republican Party members of the Kansas House of Representatives
20th-century American politicians
People from Coffeyville, Kansas
People from Owensboro, Kentucky